Nicholas Pertuit (born April 7, 1983) is a retired American football placekicker. He played college soccer at the University of the Incarnate Word and attended Billings Senior High School in Billings, Montana. He has been a member of the Abilene Ruff Riders, Iowa Barnstormers, San Jose SaberCats and Arizona Rattlers.

Professional career

Abilene Ruff Riders
Pertuit played two seasons with the Abilene Ruff Riders from 2009 to 2010. He converted 60 of 71 field goal attempts.

Iowa Barnstormers
Pertuit signed with the Iowa Barnstormers on May 11, 2011.

San Jose SaberCats
Pertuit was signed by the San Jose SaberCats on April 4, 2012. He was named Second Team All-Arena in 2012 and First Team All-Arena in 2014. The Sabercats won ArenaBowl XXVIII against the Jacksonville Sharks on August 29, 2015. He became a free agent after the 2015 season.

Arizona Rattlers
On August 4, 2016, Pertuit was assigned to the Arizona Rattlers.

References

External links
Just Sports Stats

Living people
1983 births
American football placekickers
Incarnate Word Cardinals men's soccer players
Abilene Ruff Riders players
Iowa Barnstormers players
San Jose SaberCats players
Arizona Rattlers players
Players of American football from Montana
Sportspeople from Billings, Montana
Association footballers not categorized by position
Association football players not categorized by nationality